Karl Stevens (born November 21, 1978 in Concord, Massachusetts) is a graphic novelist and painter. His first book, Guilty, was published in 2005 with a grant from the Xeric Foundation. He is also the author of The Lodger (2010), The Winner (2018), and  Penny: A Graphic Memoir (2021). His comic strips have appeared in the alternative newsweekly the Boston Phoenix (2005-2012), The Village Voice (2016-2017), and The New Yorker magazine (2018-present).

Work

Guilty
Guilty is set in Allston and Cambridge, and chronicles the events following an unexpected bus stop encounter between exes.

Reviews of Guilty noted its "painstaking cross-hatch[ing] ... and its pitch-perfect, 'overheard' dialogue" and its extremely — even "overwhelmingly" — detailed realism. In addition to receiving the Xeric award for comic self-publishing, Guilty was nominated for the 2005 Ignatz Award for Promising New Talent, has been translated into French (published by Ego Comme X) and Dutch, and is included in Stephen Weiner's The 101 Best Graphic Novels.

Comics and other books
Stevens' weekly comic "Whatever" appeared in the Boston Phoenix for three years, beginning in spring 2005.  A collection of the strips, also called Whatever, was published in April 2008 by Alternative Comics.

In May 2008 "Whatever" was followed by a new comic, "Succe$$," illustrated by Stevens and written by Gustavo Turner. "Succe$$" ran through December 2008.

In January 2009, Stevens debuted a new weekly comic in the Boston Phoenix called "Failure." Stevens' book The Lodger, published in 2010, is a selection of strips from the first year of "Failure," accompanied by oil paintings and watercolors. In 2010, "Failure" won the Association of Alternative Newsweeklies award for Best Cartoon.

2013 saw the publication of Failure from Alternative Comics which collected the last years of the weekly comic.

In 2018 Retrofit/Big Planet Comics published The Winner, an original graphic novel that focuses on Stevens's relationship with his wife Alex, and various short stories in different genres.

Since 2018 his gag cartoons have been appearing in The New Yorker magazine and website.

2021 saw the publication of Penny: A Graphic Memoir from Chronicle Books. A collection of strips about Stevens's cat.

Painting and other work
Stevens' oil paintings and watercolors have been exhibited at the Carroll and Sons and Howard Yezerski galleries in Boston. A solo exhibition entitled "The Lodger" was on view at Carroll and Sons in July and August 2010. As an illustrator, Stevens collaborated with Anthony Apesos on the book Anatomy for Artists: A New Approach Discovering, Learning, and Remembering the Body, released in October 2007 by North Light Books.

References

External links

Karl Stevens at Alternative Comics
"Failure" and "Whatever" (Boston Phoenix)
French Guilty
Dutch Guilty
French The lodger
French Whatever
2019 audio interview at The Virtual Memories Show

Alternative cartoonists
American graphic novelists
20th-century American painters
American male painters
21st-century American painters
21st-century American male artists
Living people
1978 births
American male novelists
20th-century American male artists
The New Yorker people